TOCA is a racing video game series developed and published by Codemasters. The series originally focused specifically on touring car racing, but after World Touring Cars, the series expanded to cover a wide variety of motorsport.

The TOCA series eventually gave origin to the Grid series of games.

Games

TOCA Touring Car Championship (1997)

The first game of the series was released for Windows and PlayStation platforms in late 1997 in Europe, and in summer 1998 in the United States (as TOCA Championship Racing). Featuring all the licensed cars (not including privateers) and tracks from the 1997 British Touring Car Championship, the game was critically acclaimed by the European games press, especially on console where it was widely considered the best in its genre until the release of Gran Turismo several months later.

TOCA 2 Touring Cars (1998)

The success of the first TOCA game saw a sequel arrive a year later in 1998. Whilst mainly an annual franchise update of cars and tracks, the game did add more detailed graphics, physics, multiplayer modes and other minor features. Fictional (but realistic) tracks were added, and support races such as Ford Fiestas, Formula Ford and others also arrived. The level of car damage possible during a race was also enhanced, which was a significant selling point compared with the likes of Gran Turismo. It was called Touring Car Challenge in the USA.

TOCA World Touring Cars (2000)

As the title suggests, the series made a significant advance in featuring various Touring Car championships from around the world, TOCA World Touring Cars, which was released in 2000, but despite carrying the TOCA name, a fully licensed British Touring Car Championship (TOCA) series was not included. The gameplay overall became more "arcadey" and the replacement of qualifying laps with random grid positions together with the omission of penalties for bad driving made the game much more playable for the casual gamer. Unlike the first two titles in the TOCA series, World Touring Cars was not released in a Windows version.

TOCA Race Driver (2002)

The series moved onto the 6th generation of gaming in August 2002, with the release of TOCA Race Driver (called DTM Race Driver in Germany, Pro Race Driver in North America and V8 Supercars: Race Driver in Australia). The game took the series in a new direction, and introduced a plot centering around fictional race driver Ryan McKane, trying to make a name for himself in a multitude of car championships.

TOCA Race Driver 2 (2004)

Race Driver 2 was released on Xbox and PC in April 2004, with a PlayStation 2 version following six months later. Two PSP conversions were released in 2005 and 2006, the first being TOCA Race Driver 2 in Europe and Japan and the second being Race Driver 2006 in the US. The game continued to use a scripted career mode as introduced in the previous Race Driver game but dropped the Ryan McKane character.

TOCA Race Driver 3 (2006)

The third game in the TOCA Race Driver series was released in February 2006, and continued to expand on the types of motorsport available. Open wheel, GT, oval racing, rallying, and offroad racing were all featured, and can be raced in either a detailed Pro Career mode or an open-ended World Tour. Up to 12 players are supported via Xbox Live and the PlayStation 2 version supports up to 8 online. This series is the only racing simulator that allows PlayStation players to race online before Gran Turismo 5 Prologue. It received good reviews, frequently being compared favourably to Gran Turismo 4 and Forza Motorsport, in the aspects of cars on track, damage and AI.

References

External links

 
Electronic Arts franchises
Racing video games
Video game franchises
Video game franchises introduced in 1997